Craig Valette (born October 7, 1982) is a Canadian professional ice hockey forward who last played for the Stockton Thunder in the ECHL. He spent his junior career with the Saskatoon Blades and the Portland Winterhawks of the Western Hockey League. He was signed by the San Jose Sharks in 2003 and spent five seasons with their AHL affiliates (Cleveland Barons & Worcester Sharks) before joining the Stockton Thunder for the first of 3 stints in 2008.

External links

Living people
Saskatoon Blades players
Stockton Thunder players
1982 births
Portland Winterhawks players
Canadian ice hockey forwards